Elizabeth Cowley may refer to:

 Elizabeth Buchanan Cowley (1874–1945), American mathematician
 Elizabeth Jill Cowley (born 1940), British botanist